Moonwalkers (film) is a comedic film about the faking of the moon landing
 Moonwalkers (fandom) are fanatical followers of Michael Jackson
 The list of Apollo astronauts are sometimes known as "moon walkers"